The Speaker of the Texas House of Representatives is the presiding officer of the Texas House of Representatives. The Speaker's main duties are to conduct meetings of the House, appoint committees, and enforce the Rules of the House. The current speaker is Dade Phelan, a Republican from Beaumont, who was elected Speaker on January 12, 2021.

Election 
The speaker is elected from the legislature of Texas, by a vote of its fellow members. On the first day of each regular session, the members may nominate a fellow member, and a record vote is held to determine who the speaker will be. The Secretary of State calls the House to order, and presides over the chamber until a speaker is elected.

Duties 
The speaker is the presiding officer of the House of Representatives. The
Texas Constitution requires the House of Representatives, each time a new
legislature convenes, to choose one of its own members to serve as Speaker.

As presiding officer, the Speaker maintains order during floor debate,
recognizing legislators who wish to speak and ruling on procedural matters.
The constitution also requires the Speaker to sign all bills and joint
resolutions passed by the legislature. As a member of the House of
Representatives, the Speaker may vote on all questions before the House.

The other duties and responsibilities of the Speaker are determined by the
members of the house in the House Rules of Procedure, which are adopted by a
majority vote of the members at the beginning of each regular session of the
legislature. The members give the Speaker the authority to appoint the
membership of each standing committee, subject to rules on seniority, and to
designate the chair and vice chair for each committee. Under the rules, the
Speaker is responsible for referring all proposed legislation to committee,
subject to the committee jurisdictions set forth in the rules. The rules
also allow the Speaker to appoint conference committees, to create select
committees, and to direct committees to conduct interim studies when the
legislature is not in session.

See also 

List of speakers of the Texas House of Representatives

References